Helmet Airport  is located  north-east of Fort Nelson, in the Greater Sierra (oil field), British Columbia, Canada.

References

Registered aerodromes in British Columbia
Northern Rockies Regional Municipality